Sabour (Urdu صبور) is a Union Council of Gujrat District, in the Punjab province of Pakistan.

Geography 

Sabour is located at 32°48'10.45"N 74° 3'44.45"E  and is situated on the Bhimber Road, 30 kilometres away from Gujrat and 17 km from Bhimber. A road from Kharian to Bhimber also links Sabour with Rawalpindi. Samrala, Ladian (the village of Major Aziz Bhatti Shaheed), Rolia and Shampur are neighbouring villages. Administratively Sabour is head office of the Union Council Sabour and part of Kharian Tehsil.

Geographically Sabour is situated in a plain area, but there is a small hill in the middle of the village which is being used as Graveyard of the village it is called "Tibba". Most beautiful is the eastern side of the village where there flows a rainy stream called "Nala Bhandar". There is much greenery on the both banks of it. Youth enjoy swimming on rainy days along its banks.  Bhimber Road bisects the village into two halves.

History 
Sabour is an ancient town. Documented records of Sabour exist of Sher Shah Suri's time.

Pre Partition 
Muslims and Hindus were living in Sabour before partition. Muslims were peasants and Hindus were merchants.
Roshan Lal his two brothers and family also migrated to India.
Roshan Lal had a great desire to meet or to talk to somebody from Sabour. Seven years after his death his wish come true but in a different way. His son at last met somebody from Sabour in London.

Trade and Economy
Historically, Sabour has always been reliant on employment in Military. Land Holdings are generally Small. Due to uneven land feature of Sabour irrigation through canals is not possible. Rain and sub surface water wells provide water for irrigation. Subsistence Agriculture is practiced by some but increasingly reducing in size. 
People diversified their option more after independence from British Raj. Many people joined Civilian Govt. departments and industrial Units across Pakistan. Karachi became the preferred city for employment for Sabourians during 1960s and 1970s. Sabour was usually a low-income village in the early decades of Pakistan.

Oil Boom in Gulf helped sabour's economy during 1980s and 1990s. People from Sabour provided much needed skills in Gulf countries chiefly Saudi Arabia. It provided much needed boost to local economy of Sabour. Workers in Gulf were earning good salaries are buying power of their families back home in Sabour increased many fold. Local business and tradesmen benefited from this improvement in buying power. Modern houses, better schools, hospitals and shops were all reaping positive results of improved earnings. Success in Gulf encouraged people to explore Europe and North America. Many people from Sabour are settled and working in Europe and North America. Sabour, a poor village of 1950s, is a Modern Town center of Today. 
Last decade has seen a great improvement in Dinning and Catering business in Sabour. From a humble start of Al-Karam Bofia, Sabour is rightfully a center of grilled food in Kharian Tehsil. There are many groceries, Tikka corners, and restaurants.
There are many mobile & computer shops. One of the famous shop is Imran mobile shop it have two other branches also called imran mobile shop.

The people of Sabour run a cooperative charity organization in the village. The organisation launched its projects to provide clean water and sanitary services in the village. Generous donations of SABOUR diaspora in the world and around Pakistan support the organisation financially.

Infrastructure

Sabour's location is unique with roads from Gujrat and Kharian meet in Sabour. 
Electricity came in 1966 and fixed line telephone in 1995. There are two water turbines to supply fresh water to Sabour which is a project of WHO. There is no specific marketplace but there are many shops in Sabour, most of them are situated on both sides of the Gujrat Bhimber road. Streets are paved and sewage channels are open but lined.

Schools
Sabour has had a primary School since 1905.

Today there are four Government Schools,
Government Primary School for Girls Sabour.
Government Primary School for Boys Sabour.
Government High School for Girls Sabour.
Government High School for Boys Sabour.
and few Private Schools.

There is one religious School Jamia Naqshbandai Majadadia Nooria(Madrasa) founded by Great ISLAMIC Scholar Peer Irshad Hussain Noori Churahi (Rah.A) in Sabour.
There are four Masjids in Sabour, two Jamiaa Masjids Jamia Masjid Faizan-e-Oulia, Jamia Masjid BaBa Phully wali and another two mosques in suburbs or newly built areas.

Hospitals
One Government Rural Hospital Sabour (not yet operational). 
Private Hospitals, Sadi Hospital (run by MBBS Doctor Fayyaz Hussain), three dispenser-type clinics [Dr. Ghulam Mustafa, Dr. Ghulam Nabi (Chakora), Dr. Habib Hashmi]

Sabour Cricket Team
Sabour Cricket Team won the Dolta Nagar annual tournament thrice, and the Kotla annual tournament twice led by allrounder Malik Jawad. In 2002 and 2004, Malik Jawad also played for Royal Dutch cricket club Holland, Sabour team won many more tournaments. Sabour's cricket ground is alongside Nala Bhandar.

References

Union councils of Gujrat District